Woven is an experimental rock band from Los Angeles, California.

Biography 
Woven combines electronica and rock elements, influenced by the likes of Björk, Aphex Twin, Pink Floyd, Jane's Addiction and Deftones, to create music ranging from guitar-driven drum and bass to syncopated, sparse IDM. In 2001, Woven released its debut EP titled EPrime on Interscope records. Songs from EPrime became the fifth most-added to U.S. college radio playlists in the year of its release, and landed spots on Los Angeles-based radio station KCRW 89.9.

In 2003, the band released their first full-length album with Interscope Records, 8 Bit Monk. The review on MSN's Entertainment section said of the album that it "tends to meander in Woven's self-created safe zone between electronic and alt rock", and that the band had upped the groove and removed much of the subtlety it displayed on Eprime. For the album, the band re-enlisted the Irish mixer Steve Fitzmaurice. The album was self-produced by Woven, with additional production by Steve Berlin of Los Lobos and Alan Elliott.

"My Conditioning" and "Soul Fossa", two songs off 8 Bit Monk, gained song placements on CBS's television series CSI: Crime Scene Investigation.

In support of 8 Bit Monk, Woven toured with Dredg, Buckethead, The Apex Theory, Mellowdrone, They Might Be Giants and Wu-Tang Clan's Raekwon among others as well as headlining their own shows and tours.

Woven guitarist Steve Abagon has performed with Perry Farrell and contributed guitar tracks for folk-rock veteran Rickie Lee Jones on her album, The Sermon On Exposition Street. Ory Hodis, Woven's  second vocalist and guitarist has also recorded guitar tracks on Perry Farrell’s 2001 solo electronica record, Song Yet To Be Sung. Singer/bassist Jonathan Burkes has continued to collaborate with both Steve and Richard Abagon, in the electro-rock bands Piel and A Reminder, respectively. 

In 2008, Woven released the follow-up to 8 Bit Monk with the new album "Designer Codes", recorded by drummer Marc Viner at his studio, The Cat Toy Factory.

Discography

EPrime 
EP (Interscope Records) (2001)
Beautiful
Tesion
Steady
Who Knows?
Solder Me

8 Bit Monk 
(Interscope Records) (2003)
Pillage
My Conditioning
Already Gone
I Want Yesterday
Astral Low
Soul Fossa
Who Knows
Bubble Wrap
Sync or Swim
Trepanation
Rooftops

Aftermath 
EP (Cat Toy Factory Recordings) (2007)
Inhale
You Never Knew
Cosmonaut
Machine Room
Abort Instruction

Designer Codes 
(Cat Toy Factory Recordings) (2008)
Trumpeting Strength
Perception Whore
Fragments
Where We Going
The One
Do You Feel the Same?
Been a Long Time
Cosmonaut
Sadness Last Stand
Soundtrack to a Chance Meeting
Prickly Pear
Inhale
Nothin
She Blows My Amplifier

External links 
 Woven website

References 

Rock music groups from California
Musical groups from Los Angeles
Electronic music groups from California